Comparettia, abbreviated Comp in the horticultural trade, is a genus of orchids. It consists about 50-70 species, native to tropical America. They occur in Mexico, Central America, the West Indies, and in northern South America as far south as Brazil and Bolivia, although they are particularly common in the Andes. The genus has grown markedly in recent years due to many species being transferred from other genera.

Selected species

References 

  (2009). Epidendroideae (Part two). Genera Orchidacearum 5: 248 ff. Oxford University Press.

External links 

 
Oncidiinae genera
Orchids of the Caribbean
Orchids of Central America
Orchids of Mexico
Orchids of South America